The , signed as Route K6, is one of the tolled routes of the Shuto Expressway system serving the Greater Tokyo Area and is one of seven of the routes in the system serving Kanagawa Prefecture.

Route description

The Kawasaki Route begins at the Kawasaki-Ukishima Junction as a continuation west for the Tokyo Bay Aqua-Line into Kanagawa Prefecture. The division between the two expressways is the Bayshore Route, which travels along the edge of Tokyo Bay. From this eastern terminus, the Kawasaki Route travels west through Kawasaki, paralleling National Route 409. The only interchange along the Kawasaki Route aside from its termini is at Tonomachi Junction where the two parallel routes partially connect. The expressway meets its western terminus at Daishi Junction with the Yokohane Route.

The speed limit along almost the entire length of the Kawasaki Route is set at 80 km/h. The only exceptions to this is at the termini of the route where the limit is lowered to 40 km/h. The Kawasaki Route is a part of the partially-complete , an expressway planned to link the Tokyo Bay Aqua-Line and National Route 15. The Ministry of Land, Infrastructure, Transport and Tourism plans to include the connector in an outer ring road around the Greater Tokyo Area.

History
The Kawasaki Route was first opened on 30 April 2002, with the completion of construction between the interchange at Tonomachi and Kawasaki-Ukishima Junction. On 20 October 2010, the expressway was extended west to its present terminus at Daishi Junction where it meets the Yokohane Route, though it was originally planned to be opened on 18 October.

Junction list
The entire expressway lies within Kawasaki in Kanagawa Prefecture.

See also

References

External links

K6
2002 establishments in Japan
Roads in Kanagawa Prefecture